Rio Madeirinha Ecological Station is an ecological station (ESEC) in the state of Mato Grosso, Brazil.

Location

It is in the north west of the state, and is bordered on the east, north and west by the Tucumã State Park.
The Madeirinha River, which runs in the roughly north east direction, defines the border with the west part of the state park.

The ESEC is in the Amazon biome.
It is a natural refuge for wildlife.
The dissected relief forms a variety of habitats for diverse fauna and flora.

Conservation

The Rio Madeirinha Ecological Station (ESEC) was created by the governor of Mato Grosso in decree 1.799 of 4 November 1997.
At that time it was in the municipality of Aripuanã, Mato Grosso.
The purpose was to conserve samples of the ecosystem, conserve bioldiversity and provide opportunities for education and scientific research.
Law 7163 of 23 August 1999 confirmed this creation.
An advisory council was appointed on 18 December 2014.

The ESEC is in a sparsely populated area of the state outside the agro-pastoral expansion area of northern Mato Grosso and north west Rondônia, but may be vulnerable to logging and mining, which takes place in the surrounding region.
At time of creation just 0.2% of the unit was deforested.
This had risen to 0.5% in 2002 and 2% in 2005.
The ESEC would be in the proposed South Amazon Ecotones Ecological Corridor.

Notes

Sources

1997 establishments in Brazil
Ecological stations of Brazil
Protected areas of Mato Grosso
Protected areas established in 1997